The Dornier Do 27 is a German single-engine STOL utility aircraft that was designed and manufactured by Dornier GmbH (later DASA Dornier and Fairchild-Dornier). It was notable for being the first mass-produced aircraft in Germany following the end of the Second World War.

The Do 27's precursor, the Do 25, was developed by Dornier at the firm's facilities in Spain in order to satisfy a Spanish military requirement that called for a light utility aircraft with short takeoff and landing (STOL) performance. However, the Do 25 was not selected for production by Spain. Despite this, the aircraft was developed further to produce the Do 27, which was produced in quantity in both Spain and Germany. In addition to domestic sales, a large number of export customers, such as Portugal, emerged for the Do 27, and it had a lengthy service life with some examples still being used into the twenty-first century. The aircraft was appreciated for its relatively wide, comfortable cabin and excellent short-field performance. In terms of its configuration, the Do 27 was a classic high-wing, "tail-dragger" aircraft with fixed landing gear.

History

Background
Shortly following the end of the Second World War, Germany's extensive aerospace industry was dismantled and largely dissolved due to the country having been forbidden to either possess or manufacture military aircraft. Despite this, in both East Germany and West Germany, as the nation had been divided into during the Cold War era, efforts to revive the nation's aerospace industry became widespread during the 1950s.

German aircraft manufacturer Dornier GmbH managed to retain its independence in the conflict's aftermath, and was keen to resume its aviation activities as soon as permissible. During January 1951, the company chose to establish a new technical office in Madrid, Spain, and began bidding for contracts from Spain's Ministry of Aviation; prior to this, Dornier had developed strong ties to Spain via the licensed production of the Messerschmitt Bf 109 fighter.

During 1951, a development contract was secured for a commuter aircraft that possessed short takeoff and landing (STOL) characteristics. Dornier opted to develop a new aircraft, designing a monoplane with a high-mounted wing fitted with oversized flaps, a wide wraparound windscreen, a fixed undercarriage and a relatively spacious cabin. The first prototype of the Do 25 performed its maiden flight during July 1954.

Due to the Tigre's performance deficit, it was decided to equip the second prototype with an alternative powerplant; it used the American-sourced Continental O-470 engine instead. The second prototype would subsequently function as a demonstrator for an improved derivative of the aircraft, designated Do 27.

Redesign and production

Ultimately, the Do 25 was not selected for production. Despite this setback, Dornier decided to continue refining its design to develop the Do 27, which was sized to seat between four and six personnel. On 27 June 1955, the original prototype performed its maiden flight in Spain. A total of 40 Do 27s were manufactured in Spain by Construcciones Aeronáuticas SA, designated CASA-127. However, the majority of production aircraft were constructed at Dornier's main base in Germany; the first German-built aircraft conducted its first flight on 17 October 1956. A total of 428 Do 27s would be produced in Germany.

A significant portion of the Do 27's production run were acquired by the German military. By the mid-1950s, West Germany had been permitted, and even encouraged, to reequip itself as tensions rose between East and West in the Cold War; due to its ability to operate from compact and unprepared airstrips, the Do 27 quickly garnered favour with military planners. Both the German Air Force and the German Army placed a combined order for 428 aircraft of the Do 27A and Do 27B variants, the latter being equipped with dual controls for use as a trainer aircraft.

The Do 27 was widely employed as a general purpose aircraft, frequently being used for utility transport and liaison duties. Later on in the type's production run, a modified model of the aircraft, known as the Do 27Q-5, was developed; it had the same basic specifications but was equipped with a wider-track landing gear. Furthermore, the aircraft was offered as a twin-float seaplane, the Do 27S-1; another model proposed was furnished with the larger Lycoming GSO-480-B1B6 engine, capable of generating a maximum of 254 kW/340 hp, which was matched with a three-blade propeller, the Do 27H-2.

In addition to the aircraft's adoption by military operators in Germany and Spain, Portugal received 40 new-build and 106 ex-German Do 27s. From 1961 to 1975, the Portuguese Air Force made extensively operational use of the type in the three African theatres of the Portuguese Overseas War. During April 1973, two Do 27s were shot down in Portuguese Guinea by insurgents equipped with SAM-7 Grail Man-portable air-defense system (MANPADS).

During 1966, it was decided to terminate production of the Do 27. By this point, the aircraft had been widely exported to numerous international operators, including Israel, Nigeria, Belgium, Turkey, and Congo. The type was extensively used by the German military into the 1980s, gradually being succeeded in its role by increasingly capable helicopters; many ex-German aircraft were subsequently exported and used by other operators.

Operational history 
In 1959, a Do 27 became the first aircraft ever to land on the Caribbean island of Saba, on what is still to this day the shortest commercial runway in the world.

Variants

Do 25
 Precursor aircraft designed to a Spanish requirement and powered by a  ENMA Tigre G.V engine.
Do 27
Prototype, two built.
Do 27A-1
Military five-seat single-engine STOL utility transport aircraft, 177 built
Do 27A-2
Do 27A-1 with minor modification inside, two built.
Do 27A-3
Do 27A-1 with increased takeoff gross weight, 88 built.
Do 27A-4
Variant with wide landing gear and increased Take Off Gross Weight, 65 built.
Do 27B-1
Dual-control version of the A-1, 86 built.
Do 27B-2
Do 27B-2 with minor modification inside, five built.
Do 27B-3
Do 27B-2 with increased takeoff gross weight, 16 built.
Do 27B-5
Conversions of 27B-3s to 27A-4 standard.
Do 27H-1
Do 27B-2 powered by a 254 kW (340 hp) Avco Lycoming GSO-480 piston engine with a three-bladed propeller and a larger tail, one built.

Do 27H-2
Variant of the H-1 for the Swiss Air Force with some modifications as applied to the Do 27Q-1
Do 27J-1
Production of the Do 27A-4 for Belgian Army, 12 built.
Do 27K-1
Production of the Do 27A-4 for Portuguese Air Force, 16 built.
Do 27K-2
Similar to K-1 with minor modifications for Portuguese Air Force, 14 built.
Do 27Q-1
Six-seat variant of the A-1 for civil market, 16 built.
Do 27Q-3
Four-seat variant of the Q-1 with a 230 hp Continental O-470K engine, one built.
Do 27Q-4
Improved Q-1 with auxiliary fuel tanks, 34 built.
Do 27Q-5
Improved Q-4 with internal modifications, 12 built.
Do 27Q-5(R)
Restricted category version of the Do 27Q-5.
Do 27Q-6
Variant of the Q-5 with internal changes for Guinea Bissau and Brazil, two built.
Do 27S-1
Floatplane version with enlarged rudder and a ventral fin, one built. 
Do 27T
One Do 27Q-4 converted with a Turbomeca Astazou II turboprop engine.

Operators

Civil operators

General Command of Mapping (Turkey)

 Linhas Aéreas da Guiné-Bissau

Military operators

National Air Force of Angola

Belgian Army

Belize Defence Force

Cyprus Air Forces – Former operator.

German Air Force
German Army
German Navy

Guinea-Bissau Air Force

Israeli Air Force

Lesotho Defence Force

Military of Malawi

Military of Mozambique

Nigerian Air Force operated 20 Do 27As at the beginning of the Nigerian Civil War

Portuguese Air Force operated 146 aircraft

South African Air Force operated 2 aircraft between 1958–1967.

Spanish Air Force

Sudanese Air Force

Swedish Army operated 5 aircraft between 1961 and 1991

Swiss Air Force

Tanzania Air Force Command

Turkish Army
Turkish Gendarmerie

Specifications (Do 27A)

See also

References

Citations

Bibliography

External links

 Welcome to Do 27
 German Luftwaffe Do 27 page
 Do 27 Alter Tiger, S/N 451

1950s German military utility aircraft
Do 027
Single-engined tractor aircraft
High-wing aircraft
STOL aircraft
Aircraft first flown in 1955